I28 may refer to:
 , a submarine of the Imperial Japanese Navy
 Yatsenko I-28, a 1930s Soviet single-seat fighter
 , a destroyer of the Royal Navy

Ship disambiguation pages